Bulimia nervosa, also known as simply bulimia, is an eating disorder characterized by binge eating followed by purging or fasting, and excessive concern with body shape and weight. The aim of this activity is to expel the body of calories eaten from the binging phase of the process. Binge eating refers to eating a large amount of food in a short amount of time. Purging refers to the attempts to get rid of the food consumed. This may be done by vomiting or taking laxatives. 

Other efforts to lose weight may include the use of diuretics, stimulants, water fasting, or excessive exercise. Most people with bulimia are at a normal weight. The forcing of vomiting may result in thickened skin on the knuckles, breakdown of the teeth and effects on metabolic rate and caloric intake which cause thyroid dysfunction. Bulimia is frequently associated with other mental disorders such as depression, anxiety, borderline personality disorder, bipolar disorder and problems with drugs or alcohol. There is also a higher risk of suicide and self-harm. 

Bulimia is more common among those who have a close relative with the condition. The percentage risk that is estimated to be due to genetics is between 30% and 80%. Other risk factors for the disease include psychological stress, cultural pressure to attain a certain body type, poor self-esteem, and obesity. Living in a culture that commercializes or glamorizes dieting and having parental figures who fixate about weight are also risks. 

Diagnosis is based on a person's medical history; however, this is difficult, as people are usually secretive about their binge eating and purging habits. Further, the diagnosis of anorexia nervosa takes precedence over that of bulimia. Other similar disorders include binge eating disorder, Kleine–Levin syndrome, and borderline personality disorder.

==Signs and symptoms==

Bulimia typically involves rapid and out-of-control eating, which may stop when the person is interrupted by another person or the stomach hurts from over-extension, followed by self-induced vomiting or other forms of purging. This cycle may be repeated several times a week or, in more serious cases, several times a day and may directly cause:
 Chronic gastric reflux after eating, secondary to vomiting
 Dehydration and hypokalemia due to renal potassium loss in the presence of alkalosis and frequent vomiting
 Electrolyte imbalance, which can lead to abnormal heart rhythms, cardiac arrest, and even death
 Esophagitis, or inflammation of the esophagus
 Mallory-Weiss tears
 Boerhaave syndrome, a rupture in the esophageal wall due to vomiting
 Oral trauma, in which repetitive insertion of fingers or other objects causes lacerations to the lining of the mouth or throat
 Russell's sign: calluses on knuckles and back of hands due to repeated trauma from incisors
 Perimolysis, or severe dental erosion of tooth enamel
 Swollen salivary glands (for example, in the neck, under the jaw line)
 Gastroparesis, or delayed gastric emptying
 Constipation or diarrhea
 Tachycardia or palpitations
 Hypotension
 Peptic ulcers
 Infertility
 Constant weight fluctuations are common
 Elevated blood sugar, cholesterol, and amylase levels may occur
 Hypoglycemia may occur after vomiting

These are some of the many signs that may indicate whether someone has bulimia nervosa:
 A fixation on the number of calories consumed
 A fixation on and extreme consciousness of one's weight
 Low self-esteem and/or self-harming
 Suicidal tendencies
 An irregular menstrual cycle in women
 Regular trips to the bathroom, especially soon after eating
 Depression, anxiety disorders and sleep disorders
 Frequent occurrences involving consumption of abnormally large portions of food
 The use of laxatives, diuretics, and diet pills
 Compulsive or excessive exercise
 Unhealthy/dry skin, hair, nails, and lips
 Fatigue, or exhaustion

As with many psychiatric illnesses, delusions can occur, in conjunction with other signs and symptoms, leaving the person with a false belief that is not ordinarily accepted by others.

People with bulimia nervosa may also exercise to a point that excludes other activities.

Interoceptive 

People with bulimia exhibit several interoceptive deficits, in which one experiences impairment in recognizing and discriminating between internal sensations, feelings, and emotions. People with bulimia may also react negatively to somatic and affective states. In relation to interoceptive sensitivity, hyposensitive individuals may not detect feelings of fullness in a normal and timely fashion, and therefore are prone to eating more calories.

Examining from a neural basis also connects elements of interoception and emotion; notable overlaps occur in the medial prefrontal cortex, anterior and posterior cingulate, and anterior insula cortices, which are linked to both interoception and emotional eating.

Related disorders
People with bulimia are at a higher risk to have an affective disorder, such as depression or general anxiety disorder. One study found 70% had depression at some time in their lives (as opposed to 26% for adult females in the general population), rising to 88% for all affective disorders combined. Another study in the Journal of Affective Disorders found that of the population of patients that were diagnosed with an eating disorder according to the DSM-V guidelines about 27% also suffered from bipolar disorder. Within this article, the majority of the patients were diagnosed with  bulimia nervosa, the second most common condition reported was binge-eating disorder. Some individuals with anorexia nervosa exhibit episodes of bulimic tendencies through purging (either through self-induced vomiting or laxatives) as a way to quickly remove food in their system. There may be an increased risk for diabetes mellitus type 2. Bulimia also has negative effects on a person's teeth due to the acid passed through the mouth from frequent vomiting causing acid erosion, mainly on the posterior dental surface.

Research has shown that there is a relationship between bulimia and narcissism. According to a study by the Australian National University, eating disorders are more susceptible among vulnerable narcissists. This can be caused by a childhood in which inner feelings and thoughts were minimized by parents, leading to "a high focus on receiving validation from others to maintain a positive sense of self".

The medical journal Borderline Personality Disorder and Emotion Dysregulation notes that a "substantial rate of patients with bulimia nervosa" also have Borderline personality disorder.

A study by the Psychopharmacology Research Program of the University of Cincinnati College of Medicine "leaves little doubt that bipolar and eating disorders—particularly bulimia nervosa and bipolar II disorder—are related." The research shows that most clinical studies indicate that patients with bipolar disorder have higher rates of eating disorders, and vice versa. There is overlap in phenomenology, course, comorbidity, family history, and pharmacologic treatment response of these disorders. This is especially true of "eating dysregulation, mood dysregulation, impulsivity and compulsivity, craving for activity and/or exercise."

Studies have shown a relationship between bulimia's effect on metabolic rate and caloric intake with thyroid dysfunction.

Causes

Biological

As with anorexia nervosa, there is evidence of genetic predispositions contributing to the onset of this eating disorder. Abnormal levels of many hormones, notably serotonin, have been shown to be responsible for some disordered eating behaviors. Brain-derived neurotrophic factor (BDNF) is under investigation as a possible mechanism.

There is evidence that sex hormones may influence appetite and eating in women and the onset of bulimia nervosa. Studies have shown that women with hyperandrogenism and polycystic ovary syndrome have a dysregulation of appetite, along with carbohydrates and fats. This dysregulation of appetite is also seen in women with bulimia nervosa. In addition, gene knockout studies in mice have shown that mice that have the gene encoding estrogen receptors have decreased fertility due to ovarian dysfunction and dysregulation of androgen receptors.  In humans, there is evidence that there is an association between polymorphisms in the ERβ (estrogen receptor β) and bulimia, suggesting there is a correlation between sex hormones and bulimia nervosa.

Bulimia has been compared to drug addiction, though the empirical support for this characterization is limited. However, people with bulimia nervosa may share dopamine D2 receptor-related vulnerabilities with those with substance use disorders.

Dieting, a common behaviour in bulimics, is associated with lower plasma tryptophan levels. Decreased tryptophan levels in the brain, and thus the synthesis of serotonin, such as via acute tryptophan depletion, increases bulimic urges in currently and formerly bulimic individuals within hours.

Abnormal blood levels of peptides important for the regulation of appetite and energy balance are observed in individuals with bulimia nervosa, but it remains unknown if this is a state or trait.

In recent years, evolutionary psychiatry as an emerging scientific discipline has been studying mental disorders from an evolutionary perspective. If eating disorders, Bulimia nervosa in particular, have evolutionary functions or if they are new modern "lifestyle" problems is still debated.

Social

Media portrayals of an 'ideal' body shape are widely considered to be a contributing factor to bulimia. In a 1991 study by Weltzin, Hsu, Pollicle, and Kaye, it was stated that 19% of bulimics undereat, 37% of bulimics eat an average or normal amount of food, and 44% of bulimics overeat. A survey of 15- to 18-year-old high school girls in Nadroga, Fiji, found the self-reported incidence of purging rose from 0% in 1995 (a few weeks after the introduction of television in the province) to 11.3% in 1998. In addition, the suicide rate among people with bulimia nervosa is 7.5 times higher than in the general population.

When attempting to decipher the origin of bulimia nervosa in a cognitive context, Christopher Fairburn et al.s cognitive-behavioral model is often considered the golden standard. Fairburn et al.'s model discusses the process in which an individual falls into the binge-purge cycle and thus develops bulimia. Fairburn et al. argue that extreme concern with weight and shape coupled with low self-esteem will result in strict, rigid, and inflexible dietary rules. Accordingly, this would lead to unrealistically restricted eating, which may consequently induce an eventual "slip" where the individual commits a minor infraction of the strict and inflexible dietary rules. Moreover, the cognitive distortion due to dichotomous thinking leads the individual to binge. The binge subsequently should trigger a perceived loss of control, promoting the individual to purge in hope of counteracting the binge. However, Fairburn et al. assert the cycle repeats itself, and thus consider the binge-purge cycle to be self-perpetuating.

In contrast, Byrne and Mclean's findings differed slightly from Fairburn et al.s cognitive-behavioral model of bulimia nervosa in that the drive for thinness was the major cause of purging as a way of controlling weight. In turn, Byrne and Mclean argued that this makes the individual vulnerable to binging, indicating that it is not a binge-purge cycle but rather a purge-binge cycle in that purging comes before bingeing. Similarly, Fairburn et al.s cognitive-behavioral model of bulimia nervosa is not necessarily applicable to every individual and is certainly reductionist. Every one differs from another, and taking such a complex behavior like bulimia and applying the same one theory to everyone would certainly be invalid. In addition, the cognitive-behavioral model of bulimia nervosa is very culturally bound in that it may not be necessarily applicable to cultures outside of Western society. To evaluate, Fairburn et al..'s model and more generally the cognitive explanation of bulimia nervosa is more descriptive than explanatory, as it does not necessarily explain how bulimia arises. Furthermore, it is difficult to ascertain cause and effect, because it may be that distorted eating leads to distorted cognition rather than vice versa.

A considerable amount of literature has identified a correlation between sexual abuse and the development of bulimia nervosa. The reported incident rate of unwanted sexual contact is higher among those with bulimia nervosa than anorexia nervosa.

When exploring the etiology of bulimia through a socio-cultural perspective, the "thin ideal internalization" is significantly responsible. The thin-ideal internalization is the extent to which individuals adapt to the societal ideals of attractiveness. Studies have shown that young women  that read fashion magazines tend to have more bulimic symptoms than those women who do not. This further demonstrates the impact of media on the likelihood of developing the disorder. Individuals first accept and "buy into" the ideals, and then attempt to transform themselves in order to reflect the societal ideals of attractiveness. J. Kevin Thompson and Eric Stice claim that family, peers, and most evidently media reinforce the thin ideal, which may lead to an individual accepting and "buying into" the thin ideal. In turn, Thompson and Stice assert that if the thin ideal is accepted, one could begin to feel uncomfortable with their body shape or size since it may not necessarily reflect the thin ideal set out by society. Thus, people feeling uncomfortable with their bodies may result in body dissatisfaction and may develop a certain drive for thinness. Consequently, body dissatisfaction coupled with a drive for thinness is thought to promote dieting and negative effects, which could eventually lead to bulimic symptoms such as purging or bingeing. Binges lead to self-disgust which causes purging to prevent weight gain.

A study dedicated to investigating the thin ideal internalization as a factor of bulimia nervosa is Thompson's and Stice's research. Their study aimed to investigate how and to what degree media affects the thin ideal internalization. Thompson and Stice used randomized experiments (more specifically programs) dedicated to teaching young women how to be more critical when it comes to media, to reduce thin-ideal internalization. The results showed that by creating more awareness of the media's control of the societal ideal of attractiveness, the thin ideal internalization significantly dropped. In other words, less thin ideal images portrayed by the media resulted in less thin-ideal internalization. Therefore, Thompson and Stice concluded that media greatly affected the thin ideal internalization. Papies showed that it is not the thin ideal itself, but rather the self-association with other persons of a certain weight that decide how someone with bulimia nervosa feels. People that associate themselves with thin models get in a positive attitude when they see thin models and people that associate with overweight get in a negative attitude when they see thin models. Moreover, it can be taught to associate with thinner people.

Diagnosis
The onset of bulimia nervosa is often during adolescence, between 13 and 20 years of age, and many cases have previously experienced obesity, with many relapsing in adulthood into episodic bingeing and purging even after initially successful treatment and remission. A lifetime prevalence of 0.5 percent and 0.9 percent for adults and adolescents, respectively, is estimated among the United States population. Bulimia nervosa may affect up to 1% of young women and, after 10 years of diagnosis, half will recover fully, a third will recover partially, and 10–20% will still have symptoms.

Adolescents with bulimia nervosa are more likely to have self-imposed perfectionism and compulsivity issues in eating compared to their peers. This means that the high expectations and unrealistic goals that these individuals set for themselves are internally motivated rather than by social views or expectations.

Criteria

Bulimia nervosa can be difficult to detect, compared to anorexia nervosa, because bulimics tend to be of average or slightly above average weight. Many bulimics may also engage in significantly disordered eating and exercise patterns without meeting the full diagnostic criteria for bulimia nervosa. Recently, the Diagnostic and Statistical Manual of Mental Disorders was revised, which resulted in the loosening of criteria regarding the diagnoses of bulimia nervosa and anorexia nervosa. The diagnostic criteria utilized by the DSM-5 includes repetitive episodes of binge eating (a discrete episode of overeating during which the individual feels out of control of consumption) compensated for by excessive or inappropriate measures taken to avoid gaining weight. The diagnosis also requires the episodes of compensatory behaviors and binge eating to happen a minimum of once a week for a consistent time period of 3 months. The diagnosis is made only when the behavior is not a part of the symptom complex of anorexia nervosa and when the behavior reflects an overemphasis on physical mass or appearance. Purging often is a common characteristic of a more severe case of bulimia nervosa.

Treatment
There are two main types of treatment given to those with bulimia nervosa; psychopharmacological and psychosocial treatments.

Psychotherapy
Cognitive behavioral therapy is the primary treatment for bulimia. Antidepressants of the selective serotonin reuptake inhibitor (SSRI) or tricyclic antidepressant classes may have a modest benefit. While outcomes with bulimia are typically better than in those with anorexia, the risk of death among those affected is higher than that of the general population. At 10 years after receiving treatment about 50% of people are fully recovered.

Cognitive behavioral therapy (CBT), which involves teaching a person to challenge automatic thoughts and engage in behavioral experiments (for example, in session eating of "forbidden foods") has a small amount of evidence supporting its use.

By using CBT people record how much food they eat and periods of vomiting with the purpose of identifying and avoiding emotional fluctuations that bring on episodes of bulimia on a regular basis. Barker (2003) states that research has found 40–60% of people using cognitive behaviour therapy to become symptom free. He states in order for the therapy to work, all parties must work together to discuss, record and develop coping strategies. Barker (2003) claims by making people aware of their actions they will think of alternatives. People undergoing CBT who exhibit early behavioral changes are most likely to achieve the best treatment outcomes in the long run. Researchers have also reported some positive outcomes for interpersonal psychotherapy and dialectical behavior therapy.

Maudsley family therapy, developed at the Maudsley Hospital in London for the treatment of anorexia, has been shown promising results in bulimia.

The use of CBT has been shown to be quite effective for treating bulimia nervosa (BN) in adults, but little research has been done on effective treatments of BN for adolescents. Although CBT is seen as more cost-efficient and helps individuals with BN in self-guided care, Family Based Treatment (FBT) might be more helpful to younger adolescents who need more support and guidance from their families. Adolescents are at the stage where their brains are still quite malleable and developing gradually. Therefore, young adolescents with BN are less likely to realize the detrimental consequences of becoming bulimic and have less motivation to change, which is why FBT would be useful to have families intervene and support the teens. Working with BN patients and their families in FBT can empower the families by having them involved in their adolescent's food choices and behaviors, taking more control of the situation in the beginning and gradually letting the adolescent become more autonomous when they have learned healthier eating habits.

Medication
Antidepressants of the selective serotonin reuptake inhibitors (SSRI) class may have a modest benefit. This includes fluoxetine, also known as prozac, which is FDA approved, for the treatment of bulimia, other antidepressants such as sertraline may also be effective against bulimia. Topiramate may also be useful but has greater side effects. Compared to placebo, the use of a single antidepressant has been shown to be effective. Combining medication with counseling can improve outcomes in some circumstances. Some positive outcomes of treatments can include: abstinence from binge eating, a decrease in obsessive behaviors to lose weight and in shape preoccupation, less severe psychiatric symptoms, a desire to counter the effects of binge eating, as well as an improvement in social functioning and reduced relapse rates.

Alternative medicine
Some researchers have also claimed positive outcomes in hypnotherapy. The first use of hypnotherapy in Bulimic patients was in 1981. When it comes to hypnotherapy, Bulimic patients are easier to hypnotize than Anorexia Nervosa patients. In Bulimic patients, hypnotherapy focuses on learning self-control when it comes to binging and vomiting, strengthening stimulus control techniques, enhancing ones ego, improving weight control, and helping overweight patients see their body differently (have a different image).

Risk Factors 
Being female and having bulimia nervosa takes a toll on mental health. Women frequently reported an onset of anxiety at the same time of the onset of bulimia nervosa. Another concern with eating disorders is developing a coexisting substance use disorder.

Epidemiology

There is little data on the percentage of people with bulimia in general populations. Most studies conducted thus far have been on convenience samples from hospital patients, high school or university students. These have yielded a wide range of results: between 0.1% and 1.4% of males, and between 0.3% and 9.4% of females. Studies on time trends in the prevalence of bulimia nervosa have also yielded inconsistent results. According to Gelder, Mayou and Geddes (2005) bulimia nervosa is prevalent between 1 and 2 percent of women aged 15–40 years. Bulimia nervosa occurs more frequently in developed countries and in cities, with one study finding that bulimia is five times more prevalent in cities than in rural areas. There is a perception that bulimia is most prevalent amongst girls from middle-class families; however, in a 2009 study girls from families in the lowest income bracket studied were 153 percent more likely to be bulimic than girls from the highest income bracket.

There are higher rates of eating disorders in groups involved in activities which idealize a slim physique, such as dance, gymnastics, modeling, cheerleading, running, acting, swimming, diving, rowing and figure skating. Bulimia is thought to be more prevalent among Caucasians; however, a more recent study showed that African-American teenage girls were 50 percent more likely than Caucasian girls to exhibit bulimic behavior, including both binging and purging.

History

Etymology
The term bulimia comes from Greek  boulīmia, "ravenous hunger", a compound of βοῦς bous, "ox" and λιμός, līmos, "hunger". Literally, the scientific name of the disorder, bulimia nervosa, translates to "nervous ravenous hunger".

Before the 20th century
Although diagnostic criteria for bulimia nervosa did not appear until 1979, evidence suggests that binging and purging were popular in certain ancient cultures. The first documented account of behavior resembling bulimia nervosa was recorded in Xenophon's Anabasis around 370 B.C, in which Greek soldiers purged themselves in the mountains of Asia Minor.  It is unclear whether this purging was preceded by binging. In ancient Egypt, physicians recommended purging once a month for three days to preserve health. This practice stemmed from the belief that human diseases were caused by the food itself. In ancient Rome, elite society members would vomit to "make room" in their stomachs for more food at all-day banquets. Emperors Claudius and Vitellius both were gluttonous and obese, and they often resorted to habitual purging.

Historical records also suggest that some saints who developed anorexia (as a result of a life of asceticism) may also have displayed bulimic behaviors. Saint Mary Magdalen de Pazzi (1566–1607) and Saint Veronica Giuliani (1660–1727) were both observed binge eating—giving in, as they believed, to the temptations of the devil. Saint Catherine of Siena (1347–1380) is known to have supplemented her strict abstinence from food by purging as reparation for her sins. Catherine died from starvation at age thirty-three.

While the psychological disorder "bulimia nervosa" is relatively new, the word "bulimia", signifying overeating, has been present for centuries. The Babylon Talmud referenced practices of "bulimia", yet scholars believe that this simply referred to overeating without the purging or the psychological implications bulimia nervosa. In fact, a search for evidence of bulimia nervosa from the 17th to late 19th century revealed that only a quarter of the overeating cases they examined actually vomited after the binges. There was no evidence of deliberate vomiting or an attempt to control weight.

20th century

Globally, bulimia was estimated to affect 3.6 million people in 2015. About 1% of young women have bulimia at a given point in time and about 2% to 3% of women have the condition at some point in their lives. The condition is less common in the developing world. Bulimia is about nine times more likely to occur in women than men. Among women, rates are highest in young adults. Bulimia was named and first described by the British psychiatrist Gerald Russell in 1979.

At the turn of the century, bulimia (overeating) was described as a clinical symptom, but rarely in the context of weight control. Purging, however, was seen in anorexic patients and attributed to gastric pain rather than another method of weight control.

In 1930, admissions of anorexia nervosa patients to the Mayo Clinic from 1917 to 1929 were compiled. Fifty-five to sixty-five percent of these patients were reported to be voluntarily vomiting to relieve weight anxiety. Records show that purging for weight control continued throughout the mid-1900s. Several case studies from this era reveal patients with the modern description of bulimia nervosa. In 1939, Rahman and Richardson reported that out of their six anorexic patients, one had periods of overeating, and another practiced self-induced vomiting. Wulff, in 1932, treated "Patient D", who would have periods of intense cravings for food and overeat for weeks, which often resulted in frequent vomiting. Patient D, who grew up with a tyrannical father, was repulsed by her weight and would fast for a few days, rapidly losing weight. Ellen West, a patient described by Ludwig Binswanger in 1958, was teased by friends for being fat and excessively took thyroid pills to lose weight, later using laxatives and vomiting. She reportedly consumed dozens of oranges and several pounds of tomatoes each day, yet would skip meals. After being admitted to a psychiatric facility for depression, Ellen ate ravenously yet lost weight, presumably due to self-induced vomiting. However, while these patients may have met modern criteria for bulimia nervosa, they cannot technically be diagnosed with the disorder, as it had not yet appeared in the Diagnostic and Statistical Manual of Mental Disorders at the time of their treatment.

An explanation for the increased instances of bulimic symptoms may be due to the 20th century's new ideals of thinness. The shame of being fat emerged in the 1940s when teasing remarks about weight became more common. The 1950s, however, truly introduced the trend of aspiration for thinness.

In 1979, Gerald Russell first published a description of bulimia nervosa, in which he studied patients with a "morbid fear of becoming fat" who overate and purged afterward. He specified treatment options and indicated the seriousness of the disease, which can be accompanied by depression and suicide. In 1980, bulimia nervosa first appeared in the DSM-III.

After its appearance in the DSM-III, there was a sudden rise in the documented incidents of bulimia nervosa. In the early 1980s, incidents of the disorder rose to about 40 in every 100,000 people. This decreased to about 27 in every 100,000 people at the end of the 1980s/early 1990s. However, bulimia nervosa's prevalence was still much higher than anorexia nervosa's, which at the time occurred in about 14 people per 100,000.

In 1991, Kendler et al. documented the cumulative risk for bulimia nervosa for those born before 1950, from 1950 to 1959, and after 1959. The risk for those born after 1959 is much higher than those in either of the other cohorts.

See also 
 Anorectic Behavior Observation Scale
 Eating recovery
 Evolutionary psychiatry
 Binge eating disorder
 List of people with bulimia nervosa

References

External links 

Eating disorders
Culture-bound syndromes
Vomiting
Self-harm
Wikipedia medicine articles ready to translate
Wikipedia neurology articles ready to translate